(SPTrans) (English: São Paulo Transport), is the name adopted on March 8, 1995 by the municipal local government which aims to manage the public transport system with buses in São Paulo. All bus lines are operated by concessionaires under the supervision of SPTrans, providing business planning and management of public transport. The SPTrans issues work orders for each line of operation, including setting paths, hours of operation, and necessary fleet. The fare can be made in cash or by contactless smart card called Bilhete Único. The company also manages the bus lanes and bus terminals in the city.

Bus routes
Bus routes managed by SPTrans have four digits or three digits plus one letter according to the service type, and a two-digit extension number, which is 10 by default.

Regional and radial routes 

Regional and radial bus routes within São Paulo are composed of four numerical digits in the range 0, 1, 2 ... 9. The first digit indicates the origin of the route according to the set area. The second digit is a 0 for a regional route or between 1 and 6 for a radial route, which indicates that the route separates from the main avenue of the region. The rightmost two digits serve as a serial number.

Inter-regional and diametrical routes 
Inter-regional and diametrical bus routes within São Paulo are composed of three numerical digits and an alphabetic digit in the range A ... Z. The first two digits have the same values as the regional and radial routes. The third digit indicates the region where the route ends. The fourth digit, a letter, indicates the route taken to the destination.

Two-digit extension number 
Following the four digits is the two digits that serve as the extension number.

 00 to 09 — unallocated
 10 — The default extension number.
 11 — The number used to indicate a night service.
 12 to 19 — unallocated
 21 to 29 — Extension numbers within this group operate only on part of the baseline stretch, either from mid-to-end or start to mid-way, typically used at rush hours.
 30 — unallocated
 31 to 39 — Extension numbers within this group indicate that this route's terminals typically correspond to the route that has the extension number of 10, but diverges mid-way.
 40 — unallocated
 41 to 49 — Extension numbers within this group travel part of the base path but forks after a certain point, having its starting or ending point different from the route that has the extension number of 10.
 50 — unallocated
 51 to 59 — Extension numbers within this group go beyond the route's start or end terminals that correspond to the route that has the extension number of 10.
 60 to 99 — unallocated

History 
The current four-digit bus route numbering system SPTrans uses today, where the last digit is an alphanumerical digit, was established in 1976, but was not fully implemented due to citywide changes that were carried out according to the development, and the management change within the São Paulo's city hall.

During Marta Suplicy's administration, between 2001 and 2004, the city was again divided into nine operational bus areas citywide, only this time from 1 to 9 and there were some changes.

For example, the Santana region, in the northern zone of São Paulo, which until then was area 1, is now classified as area 2, but most of the lines that pass through the Santana region are still numbered where the first digit is 1.

In 2003, when the Pirituba terminal (which is in area 1) was created, new lines were implemented, where the first digit is an 8 or a 9. The last digit is an alphanumeric digit.

Division of companies by area 

The current model of municipal public transport in São Paulo divides the city into nine different areas, and for eight of them (1 - Northwest, 2 - North, 3 - Northeast, 4 - East, 5 - Southeast, 6 - South, 7 - Southwest and 8 - West) lots were established for the distribution of companies and cooperatives that will provide transport services by buses, minibuses, vans and trolleybuses. Area 9 is in the Central Zone of São Paulo, which encompasses the entire expanded centre of São Paulo, which does not have specific lots, so there is no company that operates specifically within these limits. The lines that operate only within the limits of area 9 are the responsibility of companies in areas 1 to 8, normally, the one closest to the point considered as the beginning of the line (a rule that has several exceptions).

Contractors 

 Area 1 - Northwest - : Santa Brígida, Gato Preto, Norte Buss, Spencer.
 Area 2 - North - : Sambaíba, Norte Buss, Spencer.
 Area 3 - Northeast - : Metrópole Paulista, Transunião, Upbus.
 Area 4 - East - : Ambiental, AlliBus, Pêssego, Express.
 Area 5 - Southeast - : Via Sudeste, Transunião, Move Buss.
 Area 6 - South - : Viação Grajaú, Mobibrasil, Transwolff, A2.
 Area 7 - Southwest - : Campo Belo, Metrópole Paulista, Gatusa, KBPX, Transwolff.
 Area 8 - West - : Transppass, Gato Preto, Transcap, Alfa Rodobus.
 Area 9 - Central - : (all bus companies)

References

See also
 São Paulo Metro
 Companhia Paulista de Trens Metropolitanos - São Paulo's Metropolitan Train Company
 Empresa Metropolitana de Transportes Urbanos de São Paulo
 Trolleybuses in São Paulo